The Black Death was present in France between 1347 and 1352. The bubonic plague pandemic, known as the Black Death, reached France by ship from Italy to Marseille in November 1347, spread first through Southern France, and then continued outwards to Northern France. Due to the size of the Kingdom of France, the pandemic lasted for several years, as some parts were not affected until the plague was over in others. The Kingdom of France had the largest population of Europe at the time, and the Black Death was a major catastrophe. The Black Death in France was described by eyewitnesses, such as Louis Heyligen, Jean de Venette, and Gilles Li Muisis. The Black Death migrated from Southern France to Spain, from Eastern France to the Holy Roman Empire, and to England by ship from Gascony.

At the time, Pope Clement VI resided in Avignon in present-day France during the Western Schism, and issued his condemnations of the Jewish persecutions during the Black Death, as well as the flagellants.  During the Black Death in France, King Philip VI of France ordered the University of Paris to compose the pioneering work, Compendium de epidemia, due to the pandemic.

Background

France in the mid-14th century

At this point in time, France and England had entered the Hundred Years' War. In 1346, France had lost the Battle of Crécy. Pope Clement VI lived in Avignon in present-day France during the Western Schism.
The Kingdom of France had a population of between 16 and 20 million people, the largest population of Europe. Similarly to Italy, it was relatively urbanised.

The Black Death

Since the outbreak of the Black Death at the Crimea, it had reached Sicily by an Italian ship from the Crimea. After having spread across the Italian states, the plague reached France by a plague ship in November 1347.

Plague migration

Southern France

The plague in Southern France was described by Louis Heyligen in Avignon. According to Heyligen, the Black Death reached France in December 1347, when a Genovese plague ship from the East was forced to leave its home port of Genova shortly after its return, and arrived in Marseilles instead. The ship spread the plague in Marseilles, was subsequently forced to leave the city, and continued on its way along the coast of Southern France. The plague ship spread the pestilence all along its course, which included areas from West Marseille towards Toulouse, and north toward Avignon. In May 1348, a second wave came by land from Genova.   

In Avignon, the pope arranged religious processions to dampen the wrath of God, as the plague was interpreted by the church as the punishment of God for the sins of humanity. The pope was advised by his physician, Gui de Chauliac, to hide from the plague in Étoile-sur-Rhône, where he survived the outbreak.

The Black Death in Southwest France was not as well-documented as it was in Avignon. It was noted to have been in Carcassonne in January 1348, and in Toulouse by April that same year.
It was confirmed in Bordeaux in June 1348, but it was likely to have been present there already by as early as March. Documentation stated that it was a ship of pilgrims from Bordeaux who brought the plague to Santiago de Compostela in Spain. 

In April 1348, the Black Death was recorded to have reached Lyon.

Northern France

From Lyon, the plague spread rapidly across Burgundy. In the village of Givry in Burgundy, half of the population was confirmed to have died within the short period of August to November 1348.

The Black Death in Paris has been described in the famous chronicle of the Carmelite Jean de Venette, who resided at the Saint-Denis Abbey in Île-de-France, located outside of Paris.
At the time, Paris was the biggest city in Europe, with a population between 80,000 and 200,000 people. According to Jean de Venette, the plague first arrived to Roissy near Gonesse in June 1348. In his writings, de Venette claimed that 16,000 people died in Saint-Denis, and an additional 800 people perished each day in Paris between November and December 1348. Overwhelming amounts of death resulted in daily transports of up to 500 dead bodies to mass burial sites. The deceased were transported from the Hôtel-Dieu, Paris hospital, which was staffed by nuns, whose numbers dwindled as they perished alongside the sick that they attended to. The Black Death did not leave Paris until January 1349. 

The presence of the plague was documented in the Normanniae nova Cronica to have reached Rouen in Normandie during the feast of John the Baptist on 24 June 1348. In Normandie, the plague made it impossible to bury the corpses even in country villages, and each village which was reached by the plague flagged a black flag to warn anyone approaching. 

In the very Northern parts of France, the Black Death is described in the chronicle of the abbot Gilles li Muisis of Tournai. According to Li Muisis, the plague reached Tournai in August 1349 and lasted to November. In Tournai, the Black Death caused a religious reformation. Because the plague was seen as punishment of God for the sins of humanity, the authorities issued regulations to ban everything regarded as sinful, such as gambling, and forced couples who lived together without being married to separate or marry immediately.  

Due to the size of France, certain parts were not immediately reached by the plague, which travelled more slowly by land than by sea. Brittany and Auvergne were not reached until 1349, and some remote parts were not reached until 1351. The last part of France to be reached by the Black Death was Tonnerre, which was not reached by the Black Death until 1352.

Consequences

When the plague spread across Southern France, king Philip VI of France ordered the University of Paris to compose the pioneering work Compendium de epidemia due to the pandemic.

The migration of the plague caused panic across France, and people started looking for scapegoats. Rumours started to spread that the plague was caused by people who poisoned the wells to cause the plague and exterminate Christendom. Initially, these accusations were not directed at people of any particular category, but directed at anyone who appeared suspicious simply because they were different or unidentified, particularly travellers (such as pilgrims and beggars) invalids, or people in possession of any kind of powder.    In April 1348, Louis Heyligen reported that people were executed for well poisoning in Avignon; the same month, Andre Benezeit, secretary of mayor Aymar of Narbonne, reported to the mayor of Gerona in Catalonia that many beggars had been arrested, tortured and executed in Narbonne, Carcassonne and Grasse for well poisoning.   

These accusations were eventually also directed against the Jewish population, and on 5 July (and again on 26 September) Pope Clement VI issued his condemnations of the Jewish persecutions during the Black Death and explained that since the plague was a punishment issued by God himself, it was sinful to accuse the Jews of having caused it, and declared the Jews to be under his protection.  
While there is not much information about the Jewish persecutions during the Black Death in France, were the Jewish population was small due to the fact that Louis IX of France had banned them from France, the well-poisoning rumours from France erupted into documented persecutions and mass executions in the Duchy of Savoy, and resulted in massacres in the Holy Roman Empire, where the Jewish population was larger.

Recurrences

Bubonic plague would return regularly, but with fewer death victims, until the 18th century. The last epidemic in France was the Great Plague of Marseille in 1720.

References

14th-century health disasters
14th century in France
France
Death in France
Health disasters in France
1347 in Europe
1348 in Europe
1349 in Europe
1350 in Europe
1351 in Europe
1352 in Europe